The modifier letter apostrophe  is a letter in Unicode encoding, used primarily for various glottal sounds.

Encoding

The primary difference between the letter apostrophe and U+2019 is that the letter apostrophe U+02BC has the Unicode General Category "Letter, modifier" (Lm), while U+2019 has the category "Punctuation, Final quote" (Pf).

In early Unicode (versions 1.0–2.1.9) U+02BC was preferred for the punctuation apostrophe in English. Since version 3.0.0, however, U+2019 is preferred, because it is defined as a punctuation mark. The behavior of Unicode letters and punctuation marks differs, causing complications if punctuation code points are used for letters or vice versa.

Use

It denotes a glottal stop  in orthographies of many languages, such as Nenets (in Cyrillic script) and the artificial Klingon language.

In one version of the Kildin Sami alphabet, it denotes preaspiration.

In the Ukrainian alphabet, U+02BC is used for the semi-letter 'apostrophe' (which plays a role similar to Russian ) in certain contexts, such as, for example, in internationalized domain names where a punctuation mark would be disallowed.

See also
 Apostrophe
 Hamza
 Modifier letter double apostrophe
 Saltillo and Okina, other letters used for glottal stop
 Spacing Modifier Letters

References 

Punctuation